The Caterpillar ride is a vintage flat ride engineered by the inventor Hyla F. Maynes of North Tonawanda, New York, who dubbed it the Caterpillar when it debuted in Coney Island, New York in 1925.  It generates a significant amount of centrifugal force, causing the riders on the inside of the seats to crush the riders on the outside of the seats. It was once found at nearly every amusement park around the United States, but is now so rare that an original Caterpillar ride can only be found operating in two parks today. Though only two Caterpillars are known to be operating, there have been reports claiming there are additional Caterpillars in storage or standing (but not operating) at a few other parks.

The ride features a complete circuit of motorized vehicles which are connected end-to-end all the way around the ride, in a manner similar to a Music Express. Also, the cars travel a circular, undulating (wave-like) track very similar to that of a Tumble Bug. This ride is famous for its usually green canopy (one previously located at Geauga Lake had a yellow and black canopy) that automatically, or manually in the case of Heritage Park's, begins to slowly surround the cars and fully encapsulate them once the ride reaches its maximum velocity, though DelGrosso's indoor version called Space Odyssey operated without it. When covered with the canopy, the ride tends to look like a caterpillar, which is probably how Mr. Maynes got the name for his ride. A high powered fan located at one point under the carriage of the ride, was traditionally used to surprise riders with a blast of air as the cars go around the track.

The Caterpillar most likely served as Moser Rides' inspiration for the popular Music Express (sometimes Musik Express or Himalaya) style ride.

The Amor Express is a caterpillar/Music Express hybrid variant made by SDC. Dubbed "The Love Machine", it has the appearance of a typical Music Express, but features a manually operated canopy that is striped similar in fashion to the traditional caterpillar.

Manufacturers
Caterpillar rides were manufactured by several old amusement ride companies including:
 Traver Engineering (famous for inventing the Tumble Bug)
 Allan Herschell 
 Spillman Engineering

Maynes, the inventor of the Caterpillar and owner of the patent, was paid a royalty by the companies that built the ride, or sometimes the buyer of the ride.

Locations
The only two original Caterpillars still known to be operating are at:

 Canobie Lake Park in Salem, New Hampshire (operated with original canopy)
 Heritage Park Historical Village in Calgary, Alberta (operating with original canopy)

Original Caterpillar rides either in storage or in collections (may be occasionally operating) are at:
 Idlewild and Soak Zone in Ligonier, Pennsylvania (with original canopy and undercarriage fan)
 Dreamland Margate (previously operated at Pleasureland Southport until 2006)
 Scarborough Fair Collection, dating from 1928
 Folly Farm, Pembrokeshire, Wales A 1950s Toboggan ride was converted to a Caterpillar with operating canopy in 1955.
 Knoebels Amusement Resort, Elysburg, Pennsylvania originally a Caterpillar ride at West View Park, Pittsburgh, Pennsylvania. Sold to Knobels and operated as a Caterpillar until it was converted to a 'Cosmotron' and then converted into an indoor Himalaya in 1998 renovation

Modern remakes of the classic ride exist at:
 The Pavilion Nostalgia Park (a small portion of the Myrtle Beach Pavilion Amusement Park that was relocated to Broadway at the Beach) in Myrtle Beach, SC (operating without canopy)
 Great Yarmouth Pleasure Beach known as Mulan

Other versions:
 DelGrosso's Amusement Park, until 2011, had a caterpillar ride called Space Odyssey which was situated inside a wooden dome-like building. The ride was purchased in the 1980s from the nearby Lakemont Park, which was having financial issues at the time. The ride was moved to Delgrosso's and enclosed with many special effects like a spinning disco ball that lowered from the ceiling, an alarm that went off at the start of the ride cycle, and blacklight neon posters. The ride did not have the mechanical closing canopy, but the special effects made up for it.

References

External links
 Ride Zone
 Asociación Argentina de Amigos de los parques de Diversiones 

Amusement rides